Castoroides (Latin: "beaver" (castor), "like" (oides)), or giant beaver, is an extinct genus of enormous, bear-sized beavers that lived in North America during the Pleistocene. Two species are currently recognized, C. dilophidus in the Southeastern US and C. ohioensis in the rest of its range. C. leiseyorum was previously described from the Irvingtonian of Florida, but is now regarded as an invalid name. All specimens previously described as C. leiseyorum are considered to belong to C. dilophidus.

Description

Species of Castoroides were much larger than modern beavers. This makes it the largest known rodent in North America during the Pleistocene and the largest known beaver.

The hind feet of the giant beaver were much larger than in modern beavers, while the hind legs were shorter. The tail was longer and may not have been paddle-shaped as in modern beavers. It can only be assumed that its feet were webbed as in modern species. The skull structure of the giant beaver suggests that it participated in extended underwater activity, thanks to the ability to take more oxygen into its lungs.

One of the defining characteristics of the giant beaver was their incisors, which differed in size and shape from those of modern beavers. Modern beavers have incisor teeth with smooth enamel, while the teeth of the giant beaver had a striated, textured enamel surface. Their teeth were also much larger, up to 15 cm (6 in) long.

One other major difference between the giant beaver and the modern beaver is that the size of its brain was proportionally smaller. As a result, the giant beaver may have had inferior interactions in its environment, as well as less complex patterns of thoughts and behavior.

Classification
There are two known species:
Castoroides dilophidus (found in Florida and the southeastern states only)
Castoroides ohioensis, synonym Castoroides nebrascensis (found throughout continental United States and Canada)

These two species of giant beaver (genus Castoroides) are not close relatives to modern beavers (genus Castor).

This genus typifies the extinct subfamily Castoroidinae, which forms a North American lineage beginning with the Hemingfordian genus Monosaulax, followed by Eucastor, Dipoides, and Procastoroides, to finally culminate and go extinct with Castoroides.

Discovery and species

Castoroides fossils were first discovered in 1837 in a peat bog in Ohio, hence the species epithet ohioensis. Catalogue no.1195, Mus. North. Ind. Hist. Soc. Well-preserved skull of Castoroides ohioensis but with the mandibles lost, both zygomatic arches missing, and the facial portions of the maxillae broken away; dental series complete and in good condition. Castoroides had cutting teeth up to 15 cm-long with prominently-ridged outer surfaces. These strong enamel ridges would have acted as girders to support such long teeth. Further, the deep masseteric fossa of the lower jaw suggests a very powerful bite. Perhaps their teeth could have acted as both wood-cutters and gouges. There is no clear evidence that the giant beaver felled trees or built dams, but a possible lodge was discovered near New Knoxville, Ohio around 1912. Part of a giant beaver skull and the lodge were located in a peaty layer surrounded by loam. In Ohio, there have been claims of a possible giant beaver lodge four feet high and eight feet in diameter, formed from small saplings. The recent discovery of clear evidence for lodge building in the related genus Dipoides indicates that the giant beaver probably also built lodges. Remains of the giant beaver, along with Paleo Indian artifacts and the remains of  the flat-headed peccary, giant short-faced bear, and the stag moose were found in the Sheriden Cave in Wyandot County, Ohio.

 
Fossils of Castoroides are concentrated around the midwestern United States in states near the Great Lakes, particularly Illinois and Indiana, but specimens are recorded from Alaska and Canada to Florida. In Canada, fossils of this species are commonly found in the Old Crow Basin, Yukon, and single specimens are known from Toronto, Ontario and Indian Island, New Brunswick. A hitherto overlooked 1891 record of a Castoroides skull from near Highgate, Ontario is the earliest for Canada. In Old Crow region, Castoroides fossils occur in deposits of the Sangamonian interglacial.

The discovery of giant beaver remains in New Brunswick adds significantly to the Quaternary terrestrial mammal fauna of New Brunswick, and suggests that the terrestrial fauna was probably richer than earlier evidence indicated. The known North American distribution of giant beaver is not significantly changed by this occurrence. Specimens from the southeastern US  have been placed in a separate species, Castoroides dilophidus, based on differences in premolar and molar features. Martin (1969) considered it a subspecies, but new research by Hulbert et al. place them in their own species, Castoroides dilophidus., It is recorded from more than 25 Pleistocene localities in Florida, 23 of Rancholabrean age, one possibly of Irvingtonian age, and one of late Blancan age. 

Castoroides dilophidus specimens have been unearthed in Florida and South Carolina. The latter site (Cooper River) was dated at 1.8 million—11,000 years ago. The Castoroides leiseyorum was named by S. Morgan and J. A. White in 1995 for the Leisey shell pit. Specimens were found in Leisey Shell Pit 1A and 3B, Hillsborough County, Florida, in paleontological sites about 2.1 Mya. These specimens are now considered to belong to  C. dilophidus, C. leiseyorum is no longer a valid species name. Specimens were also found at the Strawberry Hill site, (Cooper River dredging) Charleston County, South Carolina from about 1.8 Mya to 11,000 years ago.

Extinction

Castoroides went extinct during the Pleistocene–Holocene Transition 12,800–11,500 years ago, alongside several other iconic North American Pleistocene megafauna, including mammoths, mastodons and steppe bisons. This roughly coincides with the arrival of the Clovis people in the region—who rapidly colonized the area by 12,800 years ago—as well the beginning of an aridity trend. It has been long debated if humans ("overkill hypothesis") or climate change had a bigger effect in the extinction event, but they took several thousands of years to completely die out. There is no conclusive evidence that humans hunted Castoroides. Castoroides disappeared from Alaska and the Yukon about 18,000 years ago following the Last Glacial Maximum.

Interaction with humans 
Little is known for certain about human interactions with Castoroides. Remains of Castoroides are found along with human artefacts in Sheriden Cave. Differing scientific theories exist considering whether the extinction of Castoroides was due to hunting or not by the early human arrivals in the Americas. First Nations such as the Innu and Mississaugas feature giant beaver in their traditional mythology, of which some Nation members believe is evidence of human interaction with Castoroides.

In 1972, American ethnologist Jane Beck hypothesized C. ohioensis was the basis of an Algonquin myth where a gargantuan beaver created a dam so high on the Saint John River, the lake behind it almost reached the sea. The dam was struck down by the popular heroic figure Glooscap with his axe, creating the Reversing Falls. Glooscap chased the monster upstream, creating several islands in the river while attempting to strike the beaver through the ice. The beaver constructed another dam which created the Great Lakes, and fled through these to the land beyond.

Several versions of an Anishinaabe story tell of "giant beavers" who "walked upright and stood as tall as the tallest man." Many scholars believe that stories like these could be evidence of North American indigenous peoples encountering C. ohioensis or, at the very least, their fossils.

See also
 Trogontherium a genus of giant beaver from the Pliocene-Late Pleistocene of Eurasia

References

Ruez, Dennis R, "Early Irvingtonian (Latest Pliocene) Rodents from Inglis 1C, Citrus County, Florida", 2001 The Society of Vertebrate Paleontology.
Alroy, J., Equilibrial diversity dynamics in North American mammals. pp. 232–287 in M. L. McKinney and J. A. Drake (eds.), Biodiversity dynamics: turnover of populations, taxa, and communities. Columbia University Press, New York.
Swinehart, Anthony L., and Richards, Ronald L. "Palaeoecology of a Northeast Indiana Wetland Harboring Remains of the Pleistocene Giant Beaver (Castoroides Ohioensis)." Indiana Academy of Science, 2001.

Pliocene rodents
Pleistocene rodents
Piacenzian first appearances
Pleistocene genus extinctions
Prehistoric beavers
Prehistoric rodent genera
Pliocene mammals of North America
Pleistocene mammals of North America
Taxa named by John Wells Foster
Fossil taxa described in 1838